Piadina  or piada   is a thin Italian flatbread, typically prepared in the Romagna historical region (Forlì, Cesena, Ravenna and Rimini). It is usually made with white flour, lard or olive oil, salt and water. The dough was traditionally cooked on a terracotta dish (called "teggia" o "testo" in Romagnol), although nowadays flat pans or electric griddles are commonly used.

The piadina has been added to the list of the traditional regional food products of Italy of the Emilia-Romagna region.

Origin
The piadina is typical of the Apennines area of Forlì, Cesena and Rimini, and also of the Ravenna area and the rest of the Romagna region. It is also widespread in Montefeltro, Pesaro e Urbino province, Ferrara province and the Republic of San Marino.

Etymology
The etymology of the word "piadina" is uncertain; many think the term "piada" (piê, pièda, pìda) was borrowed from the Greek word for focaccia. Others think the term was borrowed from other languages because of the large use of similar foods throughout the Eastern Roman Empire. The term "piada" was officialized by Giovanni Pascoli, who adapted the Romagnol word "piè" into its more Italian form.  Romagna was heavily influenced by Byzantium during the early Middle Ages when the Eastern Empire reconquered parts of the Western domain which had fallen to the invading barbarians. In those days Ravenna was the capital city of the Exarchate, and that would explain how the Greco-Byzantine recipe entered the local gastronomy.

The first written evidence of piadina as it is now recognized dates back to 1371, in the Descriptio Romandiolae compiled by Cardinal Anglico, who for the first time gave the recipe of the bread of the people of Romagna: "It is made with wheat flour moistened with water and flavoured with salt. It is then kneaded with milk as well, and also a little lard."

Modern era

Piadine are usually sold immediately after preparation in specialised kiosks (called piadinerie) filled with a variety of cheeses, cold cuts and vegetables but also with sweet fillings including jam or Nutella. There may be small differences depending on the zone of production. Piadine produced around Ravenna and Forlì are generally thicker, while those produced around Rimini and the Marche region are thinner and the diameter is greater.

Piadina has even found its way to space, eaten by a Russian astronaut as part of a Mediterranean diet experiment on the International Space Station.

According to Giovanni Pascoli,

See also

 Crescentina
 List of Italian dishes

References

External links
  PiadinaOnLine
  Tracce di storia della piada

Italian breads
Flatbreads
Cuisine of Emilia-Romagna
Fast food
Italian cuisine
Italian products with protected designation of origin